Great Barrier Aerodrome  is the major airfield on Great Barrier Island. It is a small, uncontrolled aerodrome at Claris on Great Barrier Island in the Hauraki Gulf off the North Island of New Zealand. Fuel is not available.

The town of Claris is adjacent and there are rental car and bicycle hire services available at the airport.  Landing fees were previously payable at Council offices, but are now billed direct to aircraft operators.

Feral pigs are on the aerodrome sometimes.

The aerodrome has two runways a grass strip and a marked asphalt runway which is 930m by 9m wide.  Landing fees are charged by Auckland Transport and are invoiced to the registered owner of the aircraft as per the CAA register of aircraft. Landing fees are (inclusive of GST). $20  for private and $12 for scheduled commercial flights.

Airlines and destinations

See also

 List of airports in New Zealand
 List of airlines of New Zealand
 Transport in New Zealand

References

Airports in New Zealand
Great Barrier Island
Transport in the Auckland Region
Transport buildings and structures in the Auckland Region